Brigadier John Edward Lloyd,  (13 April 1894 – 24 December 1965) was a senior Australian Army officer who fought in the First and Second World Wars.

Lloyd was commissioned in the Citizens Military Force in January 1914 and, following the outbreak of the First World War, served at Gallipoli and later on the Western Front in France and Belgium. He was wounded during his service.

Lloyd held the rank of major in the Australian Imperial Force when he was appointed a lieutenant on probation with the British Indian Army on 25 March 1918. He was confirmed in his appointment on 25 March 1919. He was posted to the 2nd Battalion 35th Sikhs and appointed adjutant. He was promoted captain on 15 September 1919. After the disbandment of the 2nd Battalion 35th Sikhs, Lloyd was posted to the 1st Battalion 30th Punjabis. The regiment was stationed in Lahore when he was appointed Staff Captain, Lahore District on 5 August 1921.

Lloyd retired from the Indian Army with a gratuity as a captain on 18 August 1922. He moved to Western Australia and, after working as a farmer and administrative clerk, rejoined the Citizens Military Force in 1936.

From 1939 to 1940 he commanded the 16th Battalion, being reassigned to the 2/28th Battalion in 1940, which he led for two years in the North African Campaign, before commanding the 16th Brigade from 1942 to 1943 in New Guinea. At war's end, Lloyd led the 2nd Australian Prisoner of War Reception Group in the recovery and repatriation of 11,000 Australian prisoners of war in Southeast Asia.

References

External links
 

1894 births
1965 deaths
People educated at Brighton Grammar School
Military personnel from Melbourne
Indian Army personnel of World War I
Australian brigadiers
Australian Commanders of the Order of the British Empire
Australian Companions of the Distinguished Service Order
Australian farmers
Australian magistrates
Australian military personnel of World War I
Australian Army personnel of World War II
Australian recipients of the Military Cross
British Indian Army officers
British military personnel of the Third Anglo-Afghan War
People from Ascot Vale, Victoria